Lake Balaton is a freshwater lake in the Transdanubian region of Hungary. It is the largest lake in Central Europe, and one of the region's foremost tourist destinations. The Zala River provides the largest inflow of water to the lake, and the canalised Sió is the only outflow.

The mountainous region of the northern shore is known both for its historic character and as a major wine region, while the flat southern shore is known for its resort towns. Balatonfüred and Hévíz developed early as resorts for the wealthy, but it was not until the late 19th century when landowners, ruined by Phylloxera attacking their grape vines, began building summer homes to rent out to the burgeoning middle classes.

Name
In distinction to all other Hungarian endonyms for lakes, which universally bear the suffix -tó 'lake', Lake Balaton is referred to in Hungarian with a definite article; that is, a Balaton 'the Balaton'. It was called lacus Pelsodis or Pelso by the Romans. The name is Indo-European in origin, derived from Slavic *bolto (Czech bláto, Slovak blato, Polish błoto), meaning 'mud, swamp' (from earlier Proto-Slavic boltьno, cf.). 
 
In January 846, the Slavic prince Pribina began to build a fortress as his seat of power and several churches in the region of Lake Balaton, in the territory of modern Zalavár surrounded by forests and swamps along the Zala River. His well-fortified castle and capital of the Lower Pannonian Principality became known as Blatnohrad or Moosburg (literally, 'Swamp Fortress'), and it served as a bulwark against both the Bulgarians and the Moravians.

It is unlikely it was given that name for being shallow because the adjective  is a Greek loanword that was borrowed via French and entered general German vocabulary in the 17th century. It is also noteworthy that the average depth of Balaton is not extraordinary for the area (cf. the average depth of the neighbouring Neusiedler See, which is roughly ).

Climate

Lake Balaton affects precipitation in the local area. The area receives approximately  more precipitation than most of Hungary, resulting in more cloudy days and less extreme temperatures. The lake's surface freezes during winters. The microclimate around Lake Balaton has also made the region ideal for viticulture. The Mediterranean-like climate, combined with the soil (containing volcanic rock), has made the region notable for its production of wines since the Roman period two thousand years ago.

History

While a few settlements on Lake Balaton, including Balatonfüred and Hévíz, have long been resort centres for the Hungarian aristocracy, it was only in the late 19th century that the Hungarian middle class began to visit the lake. The construction of railways in 1861 and 1909 increased tourism substantially, but the post-war boom of the 1950s was much larger.

By the turn of the 20th century, Balaton had become a center of research by Hungarian biologists, geologists, hydrologists, and other scientists, leading to the country's first biological research institute being built on its shore in 1927.

The last major German offensive of World War II, Operation Frühlingserwachen, was conducted in the region of Lake Balaton in March 1945, being referred to as "the Lake Balaton Offensive" in many British histories of the war. The battle was a German attack by Sepp Dietrich's Sixth Panzer Army and the Hungarian Third Army between 6 March and 16 March 1945, and in the end, resulted in a Red Army victory. Several Ilyushin Il-2 wrecks have been pulled out of the lake after having been shot down during the later months of the war.

During the 1960s and 1970s, Balaton became a major tourist destination due to focused government efforts, causing the number of overnight guests in local hotels and campsites to increase from 700,000 in July 1965 to two million in July 1975. Weekend visitors to the region, including tens of thousands from Budapest, reached more than 600,000 by 1975. It was visited by ordinary working Hungarians and especially for subsidised holiday excursions for labor union members. It also attracted many East Germans and other residents of the Eastern Bloc. West Germans could also visit, making Balaton a common meeting place for families and friends separated by the Berlin Wall until 1989.

Tourism

The major resorts around the lake are Siófok, Keszthely, and Balatonfüred. Zamárdi, another resort town on the southern shore, has been the site of Balaton Sound, a notable electronic music festival since 2007.  Balatonkenese has hosted numerous traditional gastronomic events. Siófok is known for attracting young people to it because of its large clubs. Keszthely is the site of the Festetics Palace and Balatonfüred is a historical bathing town which hosts the annual Anna Ball.

The peak tourist season extends from June until the end of August. Most of the beaches consist of either grass, rocks, or the silty sand that also makes up most of the bottom of the lake. Many resorts have artificial sandy beaches and all beaches have step access to the water. Other tourist attractions include sailing, fishing, and other water sports, as well as visiting the countryside and hills, wineries on the north coast, and nightlife on the south shore. The Tihany Peninsula is a historical district. Badacsony is a volcanic mountain and wine-growing region as well as a lakeside resort. The lake is almost completely surrounded by separated bike lanes to facilitate bicycle tourism.
Although the peak season at the lake is the summer, Balaton is also frequented during the winter, when visitors go ice-fishing or even skate, sledge, or ice-sail on the lake if it freezes over.

Sármellék International Airport provides air service to Balaton (although most service is only seasonal).

Other resort towns include: Balatonalmádi, Balatonboglár, Balatonlelle, Fonyód and Vonyarcvashegy.

Towns and villages

North shore 
From east to west:

Balatonfőkajár - Balatonakarattya - Balatonkenese - Balatonfűzfő - Balatonalmádi - Alsóörs - Paloznak - Csopak - Balatonarács - Balatonfüred - Tihany - Aszófő - Örvényes - Balatonudvari - Fövenyes - Balatonakali - Zánka - Balatonszepezd - Szepezdfürdő - Révfülöp - Pálköve - Ábrahámhegy - Balatonrendes - Badacsonytomaj - Badacsony - Badacsonytördemic - Szigliget - Balatonederics - Balatongyörök - Vonyarcvashegy - Gyenesdiás - Keszthely

South shore 
From east to west:

Balatonakarattya - Balatonaliga - Balatonvilágos - Sóstó - Szabadifürdő - Siófok - Széplak - Zamárdi - Szántód - Balatonföldvár - Balatonszárszó - Balatonszemes - Balatonlelle - Balatonboglár - Fonyód - Fonyód–Alsóbélatelep - Bélatelep - Balatonfenyves - Balatonmáriafürdő - Balatonkeresztúr - Balatonberény - Fenékpuszta

Gallery

See also 
 Balaton Principality
 Balaton Uplands National Park
 Geography of Hungary

References

External links

 
 
 

 
Balaton
Ramsar sites in Hungary